Durgapur Union is a union of Kalihati Upazila, Tangail District, Bangladesh. It is situated 21 km north of Tangail, The District Headquarter.

Demographics

According to Population Census 2011 performed by Bangladesh Bureau of Statistics, The total population of Durgapur union is 18573. There are 4002 households in total.

Education

The literacy rate of Durgapur Union is 36.7% (Male-39.6%, Female-33.9%).

See also
 Union Councils of Tangail District

References

Populated places in Dhaka Division
Populated places in Tangail District
Unions of Kalihati Upazila